Stephen Graves (born 7 April 1964) is a Canadian former professional ice hockey left wing. He played 35 games in the National Hockey League with the Edmonton Oilers between 1983 and 1988.

Playing career
He began his junior career with the Ottawa Jr. Senators of the CCHL and Sault Ste. Marie Greyhounds of the OHL before being selected in the second round of the 1982 NHL Entry Draft, 41st overall, by the Edmonton Oilers. In 1984, he was named to the OHL Third All-Star Team, and played his first two NHL games for the Oilers as a 19-year-old. Known for his exceptional skating abilities and speed he would play parts of two more seasons in the NHL, and spent the balance of his career in the minors or in Europe. Graves played over 750 games as a Junior and Professional.

Graves was a standout with the Canadian National Team over a couple of seasons and led the team in scoring at the Izvestia Tournament in Moscow with 5 goals and 6 points after only 3 games while on loan from his Finnish Club Team, HC TPS. His other clubs included HC Ajoie, the New Haven Nighthawks, the Phoenix Roadrunners, and HC Asiago. Graves retired after the 1992–93 season, settling in Sault Ste. Marie to work in finance with Dundee Private Investors Inc.

Personal life
Graves was born in Trenton, Ontario and grew up in Ottawa. He is of Irish descent. He has two kids, Alexandra "Alexa", and Keara Graves who is gender-fluid.

Career statistics

Regular season and playoffs

References

External links 

Living people
1964 births
Asiago Hockey 1935 players
Calgary Flames
Canadian ice hockey left wingers
Canadian investment bankers
Canadian sportspeople of Irish descent
Edmonton Oilers draft picks
Edmonton Oilers players
HC Ajoie players
HC Sierre players
HC TPS players
Ice hockey people from Ottawa
New Haven Nighthawks players
People from Quinte West
Phoenix Roadrunners (IHL) players
Rungsted Seier Capital players
Sault Ste. Marie Greyhounds players